Mr. Malcolm's List is a 2022 period drama directed by Emma Holly Jones and written by Suzanne Allain, based on her novel of the same name. It stars Freida Pinto, Sope Dirisu, Oliver Jackson-Cohen, Ashley Park, Zawe Ashton, and Theo James.

The film follows a young woman in 1800s England who helps her friend to get revenge on a suitor who rejected her for failing a requirement on his list of qualifications for a bride.<ref name="FirstLook">{{cite web|url=https://www.vanityfair.com/hollywood/2022/04/mr-malcolms-list-first-look|title='Mr. Malcolm's List': Bridgerton Meets 'Pride & Prejudice' in This Romantic First Look|first=Yohana|last=Desta|website=Vanity Fair|date=April 18, 2022|access-date=May 12, 2022}}</ref>

The film was released in the United States and Canada on July 1, 2022, and later in the United Kingdom and Ireland on August 26.

Plot
The beautiful Julia Thistlewaite (Zawe Ashton) attends the opera with the most eligible bachelor of the season, Mr. Jeremy Malcolm (Sope Dirisu). After she fails to impress him she is widely mocked in a caricature. Julia employs her cousin, the feckless Lord Cassidy, to see what she has done to offend Mr. Malcolm. Malcolm reveals to Cassidy that he has a list of requirements for a wife which Julia did not meet. Cassidy lets this slip to Julia who is offended. 

Julia decides to invite her friend, Selina Dalton (Freida Pinto) to London to try and exact revenge on Mr. Malcolm, training her reluctant friend to act as the perfect potential bride.

On the night she is to meet Mr. Malcolm, Selina accidentally runs into him in the orangery where the two debate philosophy and are immediately attracted to one another. When they are formally introduced, Mr. Malcolm invites Selina to the museum with him where he pleads his case that he and Julia had a very weak connection. While there the two run into Captain Ossery, with whom Selina was previously acquainted having served as his aunt's companion in Bath.

The following day Ossery invites Selina to go walking with him and formally announces his intention to court her as his aunt's final letter to him expressed her desire for the two of them to be matched.

Mr. Malcolm does not stop his pursuit of Selina and, aided by Julia's machinations, she continues to present as his perfect woman. When Julia and Selina accidentally run into Selina's vulgar cousin Gertie Covington, Julia claims her as her own relation. Mr. Malcolm later privately expresses to Selina he is glad she is not related to someone so crass and Selina is upset by the news. However when Mr. Malcolm learns the truth he privately apologizes to Selina and even extends an invitation to Gertie to join him and the rest of the party at his country estate where he intends to propose to Selina.

Julia decides that Mr. Malcolm is suitably in love with Selina and determines it is time for Selina to reject him. However Selina reveals she no longer wants to go forward with the plan as she believes Mr. Malcolm is honourable and had no intention of hurting Julia.

At a masquerade, where Mr. Malcolm plans to propose to Selina, Julia has her maid call away Selina and lock her in a room before sending a message to Mr. Malcolm to meet him in secret while posing as Selina. Mr. Malcolm proposes and Julia rejects him and runs away only to be immediately found out by Selina, Malcolm, and Ossery. She reveals she is still hurt by Mr. Malcolm's rejection and that Selina was a participant in her scheme causing Mr. Malcolm to become upset and reject Selina as well.

The following day a now guilt-ridden Julia tries another scheme to reunite Malcolm and Selina, but is dissuaded by Ossery who confesses he has fallen in love with her. Mr. Malcolm and Selina later find themselves alone in the garden and Mr. Malcolm accuses Selina of trying to trap him in an engagement; infuriated she wishes him luck with his list. 

After Julia apologizes, Selina decides to leave for home. As she does, Mr. Malcolm's mother blames her son for Selina's departure revealing that she was the one who plotted to have the two alone in the garden. Mr. Malcolm chases after Selina and gives her a new list of everything he is looking for in a wife, the sole line reading "Selina Dalton".

Cast
Freida Pinto as Selina Dalton
Sope Dirisu as Mr. Jeremy Malcolm
Oliver Jackson-Cohen as Lord Cassidy
Ashley Park as Gertie Covington
Zawe Ashton as Julia Thistlewaite
Theo James as Captain Henry Ossory
Divian Ladwa as John
Naoko Mori as Mrs. Thistlewaite
Sophie Vavasseur as Lady Gwyneth Amberton
Sianad Gregory as Molly
Dona Croll as Lady Kilbourne
Paul Tylak as Mr. Dalton
Dawn Bradfield as Mrs. Dalton

Production
Suzanne Allain self-published her novel Mr. Malcolm's List in 2009 and subsequently adapted it into a script. The script was discovered by filmmaker Emma Holly Jones when The Black List did a podcast script reading of the highly rated script submitted through the website in 2015. Jones pursued the rights and then brought on producer Laura Rister and subsequently Laura Lewis to produce the feature film adaptation. The team decided to make a short film, overture as a teaser to the feature version and partnered with Vice Studios’ Refinery29 and their Shatterbox short film series for female filmmakers to make the short. It was shot in October 2018 in London and was released online on February 14, 2019 and, to date, has had over 2 million views. It starred Gemma Chan, Sope Dirisu, Oliver Jackson-Cohen and Freida Pinto. Based on its success, Suzanne's novel was published in 2020 by Berkley Press and the feature film was financed. The team partnered with producer Katie Holly and her Blinder Films to shoot in Ireland.

Filming began in March 2021 in Ireland, with Zawe Ashton, Theo James and Ashley Park joining the cast. Bleecker Street acquired the US distribution rights for the film, while Universal Pictures acquired the international distribution rights for the film.

Release
The film was released on July 1, 2022, in the United States by Bleecker Street and in Canada by levelFILM, and was later released in the United Kingdom on August 26, 2022, by Vertigo Releasing. Universal Pictures will release the film internationally. 

The film was released for VOD platforms on July 21, 2022  by Bleecker Street, followed by a Blu-ray and DVD release on August 23, 2022.

Reception
Box officeMr. Malcolm's List grossed $1.9 million in North America and $138,789 in other territories, for a worldwide total of $2 million. In the United States and Canada, the film made $1 million over the four-day Independence Day weekend, finishing seventh. The film dropped out at the box office top nine in its second weekend, grossing $255,116 with $241 average revenue.

Critical response
On the review aggregator website Rotten Tomatoes, 82% of 111 reviews are positive, with an average rating of 6.5/10. The critical consensus reads, "Mr. Malcolm's List'' references countless Regency romps without particularly distinguishing itself from the pack, but it gently entertains as a diversely-cast ode to Jane Austen's works. On Metacritic, the film has an average score of 65 out of 100 based on 31 critic reviews, indicating "generally favorable reviews".

References

External links
 
 
 

2020 films
2020s American films
American drama films
Films shot in Ireland
Films based on novels